Cycnoches egertonianum is a species of orchid native to Mexico, Belize and Central America.

References

egertonianum
Orchids of Belize
Orchids of Mexico
Orchids of Central America
Plants described in 1842